is a railway station in Toyonaka, Osaka Prefecture, Japan, on the Hankyu Takarazuka Line operated by the Hankyu Railway.

Lines
Hankyu Takarazuka Line

Adjacent stations

See also
List of railway stations in Japan

External links
Toyonaka (Hankyu Railway) 

Railway stations in Osaka Prefecture
Hankyu Railway Takarazuka Line
Stations of Hankyu Railway
Railway stations in Japan opened in 1913